Energetik is a rural locality (a settlement) in Yudinskoye Rural Settlement, Velikoustyugsky District, Vologda Oblast, Russia. The population was 112 as of 2002.

Geography 
Energetik is located 24 km southwest of Veliky Ustyug (the district's administrative centre) by road. Leonovo is the nearest rural locality.

References 

Rural localities in Velikoustyugsky District